Olivier Martinez (born 6 October 1966) is a French former professional footballer who played as a defender and defensive midfielder.

Career 
Martinez was a graduate of the Paris Saint-Germain Academy. He made his debut for the senior team on 28 May 1985 in a 6–1 loss to Nancy. On 1 May 1987, he played his second game for PSG, a 0–0 draw against Nancy as well. Martinez made his final appearance for the Parisian club in a 2–1 win in Le Classique over Marseille on 21 May 1988.

During the 1989–90 season, Martinez was loaned out to Abbeville in the Division 2. There, he played more matches than he did at PSG, and he scored the first goal of his professional career. On his return to Paris, he played mostly with the reserve team, before joining Charleville. Martinez would go on to play four years in Charleville before retiring at the age of 29 in 1995.

Career statistics

Notes

References

External links 

 

Living people
1966 births
People from La Garenne-Colombes
Association football defenders
Association football midfielders
French footballers
Paris Saint-Germain F.C. players
SC Abbeville players
OFC Charleville players
Ligue 1 players
Ligue 2 players
Championnat National players